Greg Moore is an American rhythm guitarist. Moore is a former member of the R&B band Earth, Wind & Fire. He has also collaborated with artists such as Patrice Rushen, Anita Baker, Roy Ayers and Teena Marie.

Career

Earth, Wind & Fire
Moore joined the band Earth, Wind & Fire in 2002. He went on to perform on their 2003 studio album The Promise, 2005 LP Illumination and 2013 album Now, Then & Forever.

References

20th-century American guitarists
Rhythm guitarists
21st-century American guitarists
Living people
Year of birth missing (living people)